Sarai (also transcribed as Saraj or Saray, from Persian sarāy, "mansion" or "court") was the name of possibly two cities near the lower Volga, that served successively as the effective capitals of the Golden Horde, a Turco-Mongol kingdom which ruled much of Northwestern Asia and Eastern Europe, in the 13th and 14th centuries. There is considerable disagreement among scholars about the correspondence between specific archaeological sites and the various references to Sarāy, Sarāy-i Bātū ("the Sarai of Batu"), Sarāy-i Barka ("the Sarai of Berke"), Sarāy al-Jadīd ("New Sarai"), and Sarāy al-Maḥrūsah ("Sarai Blessed [by God]") in the historical sources.

Old Sarai 

"Old Sarai" was established by the Mongol ruler Batu Khan (1227-1255), as indicated by both occasional references to the "Sarai of Batu" ("Sarai Batu", Sarāy-i Bātū) and an explicit statement of the Franciscan William of Rubruck, who visited Batu in 1253 or 1254, on his way to the court of the Great Khan Möngke at Qaraqorum. William's statement, "Sarai, the new town that Baatu is making on the Etilia" is considered the first historical reference to the city; a few passages later he refers to the same settlement as "Sarai and the palace of Baatu". The slightly later Persian historian ʿAṭā Malik Juwaynī describes this settlement as both "camp" (muḫayyam) and "city" (šahr), reflecting its dual function, gradual development, and perhaps the lifestyle preferences of its various inhabitants.

As the principal seat of Batu, Berke, and their successors, Sarai was effectively the capital of a great empire, although the khan and his court occasionally resided at other sites as well. Various Rus' princes came to Sarai to pledge allegiance to the Khan and receive his patent of authority (yarlyk). In 1261, the city became a seat of the Saray diocese of the Russian Church (Krutitsy), and in 1315 also of a Catholic diocese. It also served, at least occasionally, as the burial site of khans: when he died in 1266, Berke was buried at the "Sarai of Batu", according to the Ilkhanid vizier Rashīd ad-Dīn Faḍlullāh. Berke had presumably continued the development of the city, promoting the settlement of Muslims and attracting Muslim literati, leading later Muslim accounts to credit him with the foundation of the city; this probably led to references to the "Sarai of Berke", although it is doubtful that there was ever an entirely separate city called "Sarai of Berke" (two cities, Sarāy-i Bātū and Sarāy-i Barka, are only mentioned by the 15th-century Persian author Muʿīn-ad-Dīn Naṭanzī, who is often confused about the history of the Golden Horde); it certainly cannot be identified with "New Sarai", which was founded more than six decades after Berke's death. The earliest coins struck at Sarai have been identified with issues of Berke from 1264/1265. During the reign of Mengu-Timur Khan silver coins (dirhams) were again struck with the label "Sarai" in 1272/1273; coins of more consistent standard and issue followed under Toqta Khan, especially after 1310.

New Sarai 

"New Sarai" (Sarāy al-Jadīd) is said to have been founded or formally inaugurated by Öz Beg Khan in the first half of the 14th century. The earliest explicit reference to a city bearing this name is the notice of the death of Öz Beg in "New Sarai" in March–April 1341 by a nearly contemporary Mamluk author. A statement of the Timurid historian Ibn ʿArabshāh that "between the building of Sarāy and its devastation there passed sixty-three years" would place the formal founding of "New Saray" 63 lunar years before its sack by Timur in the winter of 1395–1396, and so in 1334–1335. The reasons for the relocation of the capital are unclear, as is how substantial such a relocation actually was (since identifications of sites of "Old Sarai" and "New Sarai" are debated), although it is sometimes assumed that the rationale was a change in the level of the Caspian Sea and the extent of the waterways in the Volga Delta.

Sarai and the other major centers of the Golden Horde (like Gülistan, preferred by Jani Beg) along the lower Volga benefited from trade and exhibited a significant degree of cultural prosperity. While the origin of coins simply labeled "Sarai" remains uncertain, coins labeled "New Sarai" started to be minted from 1342. An astrolabe was discovered during excavations at the site, and the city was home to many poets, most of whom are known only by name. These included Hisām Kātib (c. 1375)and Sayf-i Sarāy, who died in 1396.

This prosperity was rapidly threatened by the onset of chronic political and military instability alongside competition for the throne of the Golden Horde after 1361. As the traditional capital and a rich and prestigious prize, Sarai became the target of most claimants to the throne. The beglerbeg Mamai, for example, took Sarai on behalf of his own puppet khans on four or five separate occasions between 1362 and 1375/1376, losing it to rivals each time. Intervening in the internal conflicts within the Golden Horde, the Central Asian conqueror Timur sacked, leveled, and set on fire Sarai in the winter of 1395–1396. The city had partially recovered by 1402, and by the 1420s minted coins again, although the Golden Horde did not completely stabilize. Shortly after the Russian traveler Afanasy Nikitin passed through in 1469, Sarai was plundered by the Ushkuyniks, riverine pirates from Vyatka, in 1471. The Muscovite commander Vasily Ivanovich Nozdrovaty Zvenigorodsky and the Crimean prince in Muscovite exile Nur Devlet plundered the "Yurt of Batu" in 1480, in a counterattack ordered by Ivan III of Russia in retaliation for the advance of Khan Aḥmad against Moscow. The decisive blow seems to have been the sacking and burning of Sarai by Khan Meñli I Giray of the Crimea in June 1502. The forces of Ivan IV of Russia passed through and destroyed what was left of Sarai while conquering the Astrakhan Khanate in 1556. After it expanded its control over the lower Volga region, Russia established the new fortress cities of Astrakhan in 1558, and Tsaritsyn (now Volgograd) in 1589.

Descriptions of Sarai

The traveler Ibn Baṭṭūṭa, who visited in about 1332, has left a description of Sarai (or, as he called it, "the city of al-Sarā, known also as al-Sarā Baraka, which is the capital of the sultan Ūzbak"). Since the foundation of "New Saray" is estimated to have taken place about this time, it is not entirely clear which Sarai was described by Ibn Baṭṭūṭa; the stated distance of 3 days upstream from Astrakhan (al-Ḥājj Tarkhān) is possibly consistent with the site at Selitrennoe Gorodišče, traditionally identified as "Old Sarai", but the archaeological excavations of that site might not support this identification.

The Damascene historian Aḥmad ibn Faḍlallāh al-ʿUmarī, who died in 1349, has also left a description of Sarai, based on the account of a traveler; once again, it is not entirely clear whether the information refers to Old Sarai or New Sarai, given its date, and references to both Berke and Öz Beg:

In 1623–1624, a Russian merchant, Fedot Kotov, traveled to Persia via the lower Volga. He described the site of Sarai:

As so often the case, it is difficult to decide to which Sarai (or other center) this description applies.

Location of Old Sarai and New Sarai 
The location and identity of the settlement or settlements called Sarai (which means, after all, simply "palace" and moreover seems to function as a synonym of "horde") have been subject to scholarly disagreement. Arguments have centered on whether or not there were two (or more) capital cities named Sarai and what were their respective locations. One of the influential views that emerged was that "New Sarai" was an enhancement or expansion of "Old Sarai", rather than a separate settlement. The other view was that "Old Sarai" and "New Sarai" were two separate settlements after all, separated by some distance, with "New Sarai" possibly associated with a satellite settlement called Gülistan. Already in the second half of the 18th and first quarter of the 19th century, Sarai was being sought variously at the large ruin fields of Tsarevskoe gorodishche and Selitrennoe gorodishche, both located (some 250 km apart) on the left bank of the Akhtuba, a left distributary of the Volga, which remain the most impressive archaeological sites in the area.

During the late 19th-late 20th century, the dominant view that resulted from earlier studies, was that "Old Sarai" was founded in the 13th century by Batu and located at Selitrennoe gorodishche (previously also called Dzhigit Hadzhi,  just northwest of modern Selitrennoe, about 30 km southeast of Kharabali and about 120 km north from Astrakhan), while "New Sarai" was founded later in the 13th century by Berke and made capital in the early 14th century by Öz Beg, and was located at Tsarevskoe gorodishche (previously also called Tsarevy Pady, just northwest of modern Tsarev and farther west of Kolobovka, about 55 km east-southeast of Volzhsky). The Selitrennoe gorodishche archaeological site was described as "Gorodishche Selitrennoe ... remains of the Golden Horde capital Sarai-Batu" on the official sign in at the site, while the corresponding sign at the Tsarevskoe gorodishche archaeological site read "Ruins of Sarai-Berke (New Sarai)".

This apparent certainty was eventually eroded by subsequent scholarship. First, it was noted that "New Sarai" could not be associated with Berke on historical, archaeological, and numismatic grounds, leading to a modification of the reconstruction: "New Sarai" was built by Öz Beg, and both "Sarai Batu" and "Sarai Berke" referred to "Old Sarai". Second, the analysis of the archaeological remains and distribution of found coins led to the realization that, while Selitrennoe gorodishche matched Sarai (or more specifically "New Sarai"), Tsarevskoe gorodishche did not, and was likely to represent the hitherto unlocated city of Gülistan, which was developed by Jani Beg and rivaled Sarai as a khan's residence and mint in the 1350s and 1360s but then declined. This conclusion quickly gained support among the experts, and the present general consensus is that Selitrennoe gorodishche is "New Sarai", while Tsarevskoe gorodishche is Gülistan.

There is currently no consensus on the location and identification of "Old Sarai". Some scholars suppose that it was a less impressive settlement whose ruins are yet unnoticed or obscured under those of "New Sarai" at Selitrennoe gorodishche, or were destroyed by changing water courses and levels. Others have sought a suitable archaeological site downstream of Selitrennoe gorodishche to identify with "Old Sarai". Here there are extensive remains of Golden Horde settlements, especially at Aksarayskoe gorodishche (at modern Lapas, medieval Dawlat-Khan), and at Akhtubinskoe gorodishche (at modern Komsomol'skiy, medieval Ak-Saray). Apart from a tentative suggestion for Vol'noe 15 km downstream from Selitrennoe, Akhtubinskoe gorodishche at Komsomol'skiy has also been suggested, and a case has been made for Krasnoyarskoe gorodishche in Krasny Yar, where the necropolis on the neighboring Mayachny hill has yielded some coins from the 13th century.

The question remains open. The account of William of Rubruck (1254) ensures a location for the Sarai of Batu at or slightly above the apex of the Volga Delta, on the left edge of the Volga-Akhtuba river sistem. This is something possibly compatible with Selitrennoe gorodishche, or perhaps rather with a site farther downstream, between it and the apex of the Delta. This is also consistent with the account of Abū al-Fidāʾ (1321), which places Sarai on the Volga only 2 days above the Caspian coast, and with that of Ibn Baṭṭūṭa, who reached Sarai 3 days after (Old) Astrakhan. Pegolotti (writing in 1335–1343) gives a single day's journey between Sarai and Astrakhan, while the Nikon Chronicle cites 2 days for the same journey. Only the account of William of Rubruck refers without any doubt to "Old Sarai", since it dates to the reign of Batu. If "Old Sarai" and "New Sarai" coexisted for some time at some distance from each other, "Old Sarai" ought to be sought downstream of "New Sarai". This might be confirmed by a 15th-century map from the Franciscan monastery of Lesina (Hvar), which places Saray (apparently "New Sarai" at Selitrennoe gorodishche) on the Volga, above Dolatcana (Dawlat-Khan, at Aksarayskoe gorodishche/Lapas), above Eschisari (Eski Saray, i.e., "Old Sarai"). One interpretation of the evidence would place Batu's original camp on the Akhtuba across from modern Seitovka (and just south from modern Aksaraysky), "Old Sarai" a little upstram at medieval Ak-Saray (Akhtubinskoe gorodishche, Komsomol'skiy), the major royal necropolis a little upstream at medieval Dawlat-Khan (Aksarayskoe gorodishche, Lapas), and "New Sarai" a little upstream at Selitrennoe gorodishche.

Little Sarai 

Sarai Juk (Sarāyjūq or Sarāyčūq in Perso-Arabic texts, Sarayçık in Turkic ones, "Little Sarai") was a city on the lower Ural River. It is sometimes conflated with the other Sarais in historical and modern accounts, and was once considered a possible location for the capital of the Golden Horde. This town did serve as the main city of the Nogai Horde, one of the successors of the Golden Horde. Although sacked by the Ural Cossacks in 1580, it was later used as the headquarters by some Kazakh khans.

Sarai-Batu Museum and Tourist Center 

Located just under 5 km northwest of the border of the archaeological site of Selitrennoe gorodishche (the medieval "New Sarai") is the "Sarai-Batu" open air museum and tourist center. This was originally built in 2011 as a set for the filming of the 2012 film The Horde, and it was also used as the setting for a few scenes in the 2016 series Sophia. The sets, built of wood covered with cement and then clay, were recovered with clay again in 2013 in preparation for the continued use of the structures. The sets represent several spaces within the Golden Horde city, combining both attention to reproducing genuine details uncovered by archaeologists and an element of fantasy inspired by medieval and pre-modern settlements in the Eurasian Steppes. They were converted into an open air museum and tourist center at the initiative of the governor of Astrakhan Oblast, Alexander Zhilkin, and opened to visitors in 2018. The center serves as an educational immersive environment, as a location for historical festivals and reenactor events, camel rides, souvenir shopping, and visits to the archaeological site of Selitrennoe gorodishche.

See also
 Bakhchisaray
 Elista

References

Citations

General and cited references 
 Allsen, T. T., "Saray", in: Encyclopaedia of Islam, Second Edition, P. Bearman et al. (eds.). Consulted online on 5 January 2022 http://dx.doi.org/10.1163/1573-3912_islam_SIM_6628
 Atwood, C. P. "Saray and New Saray", in: Encyclopedia of Mongolia and the Mongol Empire. New York: Facts on File, 2004: 488–489.
 Boyle, J. A. (trans.), The History of the World-Conqueror by ʿAla-ad-Din ʿAta-Malik Juvaini, vol. 1, Cambridge, MA, 1958.
 Bukharaev, R., Islam in Russia: The Four Seasons, London: Routledge, 2013.
 Egorov, V. L., Istoričeskaja geografija Zolotoj Ordy v XIII-XIV vv., Moscow, 1985.
 Evans, A. (ed.), Francesco Balducci Pegolotti, La Pratica della Mercatura, Cambridge, MA, 1936.
 Evstratov, I. V., "O zolotoordynskih gorodah, nahodivšihsja na mestah Selitrennogo i Carevskogo gorodišč," in: Èpoha bronzy i rannij železnyj vek v istorii drevnih plemen južnorusskih stepej 2, Saratov, 1997: 88–118.
 Fren (Frähn), H. M., Montey hanov ulusa Džučieva ili Zolotoj Ordy, St Petersburg, 1832. 
 Gibb, H. A. R. (trans.), The Travels of Ibn Baṭṭūṭa A. D. 1325-1354. Vol. 2. Cambridge, 1962.
 Goldschmidt, E. P., "The Lesina Portolan Chart of the Caspian Sea," The Geographical Journal 103 (1944) 272-278.
 Gončarov, E. J., "Staryj i Novyj Saraj - stolica Zolotoj Ordy (novyj vzgljadna izvestnye istočniki", Stepi Evropy v èpoh u srednevekov'ja 1 (2000) 345–350.
 Grigor'ev, V. V., "O mestopoloženie Saraja, stolocy Zolotoj-Ordy", in: Rossija i Azija, St. Petersburg, 1876.
 Hammer-Purgstall, J. von, Geschichte der Goldenen horde in Kiptschak, Pest, 1840.
 Howorth, H. H., History of the Mongols from the 9th to the 19th century, Part II.1, London, 1880.
 
 Krivošeev, A. A., Donskoj ulus Zolotoj Ordy, Rostov-na-Donu, 2007.
 Kuznecova, N. A., Hoždenie kupca Fedota Kotova v Persiju, Moscow, 1958. (Н. А. Кузнецова, Хождение купца Федота Котова в Персию [Journey of the merchant Fedot Kotov to Persia] (Moscow, U.S.S.R.: 1958), page 30.) 
 MacKenzie, D., M. W. Curran. (2002). A History of Russia, the Soviet Union, and Beyond. Belmont, CA: Wadsworth/Thomson Learning. 
 Mackintosh-Smith, T. (ed.), The Travels of Ibn Battutah, London: Picador, 2002.
 
 May, T., The Mongol Empire, Edinburgh, 2018.
 Pačkalov, A. V., "Numismatic evidence for the location of Saray, the capital of the Golden Horde," in: N. Holmes (ed.), Proceedings of the XIV International Numismatic Congress, Glasgow, 2011. Vol. 2. Glasgow, 2011.
 Pačkalov, A. V., "O mestopoloženija Saraja (pervoj stolicy Zolotoj Ordy)," Arheologija ta ètnologija shidnoi Uvropi, Odesa, 2002: 175–178.
 Petrov, P. N., K. V. Kravcov, S. V. Gumajunov, "Monety Saraja pervoj poloviny 660-h gg.h./ 1260-h gg.," Zolotoordynskoe obozrenie 6 (2018) 145-158.
 Pigarëv, E. M., "Administrativno-territorial'naja struktura oblasti Saraj (del'ta r. Volga)," in: S. G. Bočarov and A. G. Sitdikov (eds.), Genuèzskaja Gazarija i Zolotaja Orda, 2, Kazan', 2019: 483-508.
 Pigarëv, E. M., "Del'ta Volgi v XIII-XIV vv.," Trudy V (XXI) Vserossijskogo arheologičeskogo s"ezda v Barnaule 3, Barnaul, 2017: 287–291.
 Pigarëv, E. M., "Russkie vešči iz zolotoordynskoj stolicy - goroda Saraj al-Džedid (k voprosu o rasselenii russkih v zolotoordynskih nižnevolžskih gorodah," Narody i religii Evrazii 26 (2021) 49–66.
 Pohlëbkin, V. V., Tatary i Rus': 360 let otnošenij 1238-1598, Moscow, 2000.
 Rockhill, W. W. (trans.), The journey of William of Rubruck to the eastern parts of the world, 1253-1255, as narrated by himself, London, 1900.
 Rogers, J. M., "Recent Archaeological Work on the Golden Horde," Bulletin of the Asia Institute 14 (2000) 135–146.
 Rudakov, V. G., "K voprosu o dvuh stolicah v Zolotoj Orde i mestopoloženii goroda Gjulistana," in: I. V. Belocerkovskaja (ed.), Naučnoe nasledie A. P. Smirnova i sovremennye problemy arheologii Volgo-Kam'ja, Moscow, 2000: 305–323.
 Safargaliev, M. G., Raspad Zolotoj Ordy. Saransk, 1960.
 Sagdeeva, R. Z., Serebrjannye monety hanov Zolotoj Ordy, Moscow, 2005.
 Sanders, J. J. (trans.), Ahmed Ibn Arabshah, Tamerlane or Timur the Great Amir, London, 1936.
 Shamiloglu, U., "The rise of urban centers in the Golden Horde and the city of Ükek," Golden Horde Review 6 (2018) 18-40.
 Siksimov, D. A., "Problema lokalizacii Saraja XIII veka v sovremennoj istoriografii," Vestnik Volgu 4:12 (2007) 117–126.
 Tizengauzen, V. G. (trans.), Sbornik materialov, otnosjaščihsja k istorii Zolotoj Ordy. Izvlečenija iz arabskih sočinenii, republished as Istorija Kazahstana v arabskih istočnikah. 1. Almaty, 2005.
 Vásáry, I., "Nog̲h̲ay", in: Encyclopaedia of Islam, Second Edition, P. Bearman et al. (eds.). Consulted online on 8 January 2022 <http://dx.doi.org/10.1163/1573-3912_islam_COM_0869> 
 Vasil'evič, K.V. et al., Atlas Istorii SSSR 1, Moscow, 1948.
 Zajcev, I. V. Astrahanskoe hanstvo'', Moscow, 2006.

Geography of Astrakhan Oblast
Destroyed cities
Defunct towns in Russia
1240s establishments in Asia
Populated places established in the 1240s
Populated places on the Volga
Golden Horde
Former populated places in Russia